Pisa is a genus of crabs, containing the following species:
Pisa armata (Latreille, 1803)
Pisa calva Forest & Guinot, 1966
Pisa carinimana Miers, 1879
Pisa hirticornis (Herbst, 1804)
Pisa lanata (Lamarck, 1801)
Pisa muscosa (Linnaeus, 1758)
Pisa nodipes (Leach, 1815)
Pisa sanctaehelenae Chace, 1966
Pisa tetraodon (Pennant, 1777)

References

Majoidea